
Gmina Błaszki is an urban-rural gmina (administrative district) in Sieradz County, Łódź Voivodeship, in central Poland. Established by the noble family Baszczyk or Blaszczyk (means of Baszczyk/Blaszczyk).

Villages
Apart from the town of Błaszki (Baszczyk), Gmina Błaszki contains the villages and settlements of Adamki, Borysławice, Brończyn, Brudzew, Bukowina, Chociszew, Chrzanowice, Cienia Wielka, Domaniew, Garbów, Golków, Gorzałów, Gruszczyce, Grzymaczew, Gzików, Jasionna, Kalinowa, Kamienna-Kolonia, Kamienna-Wieś, Kije, Kobylniki, Kociołki, Kokoszki, Kołdów, Korzenica, Kwasków, Lubanów, Łubna-Jakusy, Łubna-Jarosłaj, Maciszewice, Marianów, Morawki, Mroczki Małe, Nacesławice, Niedoń, Orzeżyn, Romanów, Równa, Sarny, Sędzimirowice, Skalmierz, Smaszków, Stok Nowy, Stok Polski, Sudoły, Suliszewice, Tuwalczew, Włocin-Kolonia, Włocin-Wieś, Wójcice, Wojków, Woleń, Wrząca, Zawady, Żelisław and Żelisław-Kolonia.

Neighbouring gminas
Gmina Błaszki is bordered by the gminas of Brąszewice, Brzeziny, Goszczanów, Szczytniki, Warta and Wróblew.

References
Polish official population figures 2006

Blaszki
Sieradz County